The discography of Wendy Moten, an American singer, consists of six studio albums (including one holiday album), an extended play, and eleven singles.

Studio albums

Extended play

Singles

As main artist

Promotional singles

Other appearances

Other recorded songs

Music videos

References 

Discographies of American artists
Pop music discographies